Jiul may refer to these places in Romania:

 the River Jiu ( + )
 Jiul de Vest
 Jiul de Est
 A village in Țuglui Commune, Dolj County